AMGTV is an American family-oriented television network featuring television programming consisting of drama, sports, movies, entertainment, how-to, hunting and fishing, children's shows, and other features, much of it repackaged from off-network and first-run syndication.  The network is owned by the American company Access Media Group.

AMGTV provides programming to television stations in the United States. AMGTV also syndicates several movie packages and music specials to stations outside their affiliate base.

The president of AMGTV is Terry Elaqua.

Programming

Morning Programming 
 Daytime
 Business First
 Doctor & The Diva
 Bloom
 Marc and Mandy

Children 
 Laura McKenzie Traveler
 Great Big World
 Sports Stars Of Tomorrow

Former 

 Alarm Clock
 Angel's Friends
 Ariel & Zoey & Eli, Too
 Beta Records TV
 Curiosity Quest
 Eco Company
 Edgemont
 Missing
 Laura McKenzie's Traveler
 Potty Time Theater
 The Centsables
 Cold Squad
 Da Vinci's Inquest
 Republic of Doyle
 SAF3
 The Border
 Heartland
 Dog The Bounty Hunter
 Game Plane
 Money TV
 OK! TV
 Q With Jian
 Steve Gadlin's Star Makers
 The Conspiracy Show
 Whacked Out Videos
 Whacked Out Sports
 White House Chronicle
 Garden Travels
 Gagging & Grubbing
 Hometime
 Robert Earl's Be My Guest
 The Coastal Gardener
 Jimmy Houston
 Jimmy Houston Outdoors
 Sporting Dog TV
 Wing Shooting
 Bluegrass Ridge
 Country Fix
 Country Juke Box - Time Life
 Music Mix USA
 Nashville Unleashed
 Southern Glory
 It's Yoko!
 Stargate SG1
 Classic Car Garage
 Grab it All
 Minute Sport Report
 Overly Polo Club Today
 Pro Wrestling Around the World
 Rolling Art
 The Real Winning Edge
 Small Town Big Deal
 Wildside Anarchy

Sports 
On October 10, 2010 the American Indoor Football Association (AIFA) announced that AMGTV has agreed to air games from the upcoming 2011 AIFA West season. They had previously carried the 2010 season, prior to when the league split. The AIFA West ceased operations January 2011; neither the league nor the network have indicated whether the deal is valid for the 2012 revival of the league. AIFA's successor, American Indoor Football, folded in 2017.

References

External links
 

Television networks in the United States
Television channels and stations established in 1985
1985 establishments in the United States